Kionoceras is an extinct nautiloid cephalopod genus included in the orthocerid family Kionoceratidae with scattered worldwide distribution from the Middle Ordovician to the Lower Permian. Kionoceratids are orthocerids with prominent longitudinal ornamentation on their shells, sometimes augmented by secondary transverse ornamentation. Orthocerids are, of course, prehistoric nautiloides with generally straight and elongate shells, mostly with central or subcentral siphuncles. (Sweet 1964)

Kionoceras is characterized by long, slender to rapidly expanding, shells with prominent longitudinal ribs separated by concave interspaces and, often, less conspicuous longitudinal and transverse lirae and striae. The siphuncle is central or subcentral, generally orthochoanitic; empty in Silurian type-species and in most from the Ordovician, but with annulosiphonate deposits in some from the Silurian and later.

Kionoceras is found in North America, Europe, Asia, and Australia. The type-species Kionocers doricum comes from the Middle Silurian of Central Europe

See also

 Nautiloid
 List of nautiloids

References
 Sweet, W.C. 1964: Nautiloidea - Orthocerida; Treatise on Invertebrate Paleontology Part K, Mollusca 3; Teichert and Moore (eds).
 Sepkoski, J.J. Jr. 2002. A compendium of fossil marine animal genera. Sepkoski's Online Genus Database (CEPHALOPODA)

Nautiloids
Middle Ordovician first appearances
Cisuralian genus extinctions
Paleozoic molluscs of North America
Paleozoic life of Ontario
Paleozoic life of Manitoba
Paleozoic life of New Brunswick
Paleozoic life of the Northwest Territories
Paleozoic life of Nunavut
Paleozoic life of Quebec